The Achá Cabinet constituted the 26th to 29th cabinets of the Bolivian Republic. It was formed on 17 May 1861, 13 days after José María de Achá was sworn-in as the 14th president of Bolivia following his election by the Constituent National Assembly, succeeding the Government Junta. It was dissolved on 28 December 1864 upon Achá's overthrow in a coup d'état and was succeeded by the Cabinet of Mariano Melgarejo.

Composition

History 
One future president and one ex-president, Sebastián Ágreda (1841) and Aniceto Arce (1882–1892) were members of this cabinet.

Cabinets

Structural changes

References

Notes

Footnotes

Bibliography 

 

1861 establishments in Bolivia
1864 disestablishments in Bolivia
Cabinets of Bolivia
Cabinets established in 1861
Cabinets disestablished in 1864